Vernon Duane Barger (born June 5, 1938 in Curllsville, Pennsylvania) is an American theoretical physicist, specializing in elementary particle physics.

Education and career
Barger graduated from Pennsylvania State University in 1960 with a B.S. in engineering science and in 1963 with a Ph.D. in theoretical physics. His doctoral advisor was Emil Kazes. In the physics department of the University of Wisconsin–Madison (UW–Madison), Barger became in 1963 a research associate, in 1965 an assistant professor, in 1968 full professor, and in 1983 the J. H. Van Vleck Professor of Physics. At UW–Madison he held a Hillsdale Professorship from 1987 to 1991 and since 1991 has held a Vilas Professorship.

Barger has done research on collider physics phenomenology (especially related to the Large Hadron Collider), Higgs bosons, supersymmetry, and grand unified theories, as well as "neutrino oscillations, particle dark matter, early universe cosmology, heavy quarks and the Regge pole model."

He has held visiting appointments at CERN (1972), at Durham University (1983), at the University of Hawaii (1970, 1979, and 1982), at the Kavli Institute for Theoretical Physics in Santa Barbara, at Rutherford Appleton Laboratory (1972), at SLAC (1975), at the University of Tokyo, and at the University of Washington.

Barger was elected in 1977 a Fellow of the American Physical Society. He was a Guggenheim Fellow for the academic year 1971–1972. In 1998 he was a Frontier Fellow am Fermilab. In 2021 he received the Sakurai Prize for "pioneering work in collider physics contributing to the discovery and characterization of the W boson, top quark, and Higgs boson, and for the development of incisive strategies to test theoretical ideas with experiments."

Selected publications

Articles
 
  (over 600 citations)
  (over 850 citations)
 
 
 
 
  1999 (over 550 citations)

Books
 
 
 
 
  (updated edition)
  hbk

References

1938 births
Living people
20th-century American physicists
21st-century American physicists
Particle physicists
Theoretical physicists
Pennsylvania State University alumni
University of Wisconsin–Madison faculty
Fellows of the American Physical Society
People from Clarion County, Pennsylvania